Ewen Henry Harvey Green (16 October 1958 − 16 September 2006), known as E.H.H. Green or Ewen Green, was a British historian famed for his work on 20th-century Britain and, in particular, the history of the 20th-century Conservative Party.

Born in Torbay and brought up in Brixham, he was educated at Churston Ferrers Grammar School where he developed his taste for history, which he went on to study at University College London where he was awarded the Derby studentship for the best first of 330 candidates. In 1980 he became a graduate student at St John's College, Cambridge, working on politics in the Edwardian period, before taking up a junior research fellowship at Brasenose College, Oxford in 1986.

In 1990, he went to Reading University before, in 1995, returning to Oxford as a tutor and fellow of Magdalen. For the university, he became a Lecturer in modern history, rising to the position of Reader in 2004.

His first book, The Crisis of Conservatism, focussed on the Edwardian period and appeared in 1995. His second book, Ideologies of Conservatism (2002), disclosed the unexpected long-term continuities in Conservative political thinking. His third, Thatcher (2006), examined the party in recent decades.

He was diagnosed with multiple sclerosis in 1999 but kept up his academic commitments for several years before taking early retirement. He died in 2006 at the age of 47.

Published works
The Crisis of Conservatism: The Politics, Economics and Ideology of the Conservative Party 1880-1914 (London: Routledge, 1995)
Ideologies of Conservatism (Oxford: Oxford University Press, 2002).
Thatcher (London: Hodder Arnold, 2006).
Balfour (London: Haus Publishing, 2006).

External links
 Guardian obituary
Independent obituary

1958 births
2006 deaths
Deaths from multiple sclerosis
Neurological disease deaths in the United Kingdom
Alumni of University College London
Alumni of St John's College, Cambridge
Fellows of Magdalen College, Oxford
Academics of the University of Reading
People associated with the History Department, University College London
People from Brixham
People educated at Churston Ferrers Grammar School
20th-century British historians